The Windsor Lancers football team represents the University of Windsor in Windsor, Ontario in the sport of Canadian football in the Ontario University Athletics conference of U Sports. The Windsor Lancers football team has been in continuous operation since 1968. The team won its only Yates Cup conference championship in 1975 as winners of the OQIFC West Division. The program is one of six currently in U Sports football that have not appeared in a Vanier Cup game. The Lancers have had three Hec Crighton Trophy winners, with Andrew Parici in 1972, Scott Mallender, in 1979, and Daryl Stephenson in 2006.

Recent history
The football team was led by head coach Joe D'Amore from 2011 to 2018. D'Amore was named the OUA Football Coach of the Year in 2011 and led the football program to four straight OUA playoff appearances in his first four seasons. Quarterback Austin Kennedy (2010–14) had an outstanding career for the Lancers as he was a three-time OUA conference all-star, was the OUA career record holder with 79 touchdown passes and became the fourth quarterback in CIS history to pass for more than 10,000 yards. He was also selected as one of the CIS Top Eight Academic All-Canadians for the 2014–15 season. Following four straight years in the playoffs, the Lancers missed the post-season from 2015 to 2018. D'Amore resigned following the 2018 season and Jean-Paul Circelli was hired as his replacement.

Season-by-season record
The following is the record of the Windsor Lancers football team since 2000:

National award winners
Hec Crighton Trophy: Andrew Parici (1972), Scott Mallender, (1979), Daryl Stephenson (2006).
J. P. Metras Trophy: Matt Morencie (2009)

Windsor Lancers in the CFL

As of the end of the 2022 CFL season, two former Lancers players are on CFL teams' rosters:
Mike Dubuisson, Edmonton Elks
Chris Osei-Kusi, Edmonton Elks

As of the start of the 2022 NFL season, one former Lancers player is on an NFL team's roster:
Drew Desjarlais, New England Patriots

References

External links
 

U Sports football teams
Football